Stephen Paul James Parsons (born 7 October 1957) is an English former professional footballer who played in the Football League as a midfielder.

References

1957 births
Living people
Footballers from Hammersmith
English footballers
Association football midfielders
Walton & Hersham F.C. players
Wimbledon F.C. players
Leyton Orient F.C. players
Hayes F.C. players
Hendon F.C. players
Wembley F.C. players
IFK Holmsund players
Redbridge Forest F.C. players
English Football League players
People educated at Phoenix High School, London